Simon Murphy may refer to:

 Simon Murphy (conductor) (born 1973), Australian conductor and viola player
 Simon Murphy (British politician) (born 1962), former Member of the European Parliament
 Simon J. Murphy Sr. (1820–1910), millionaire lumberman in Maine, Detroit, and Humboldt County in Northern California
 Simon J. Murphy Jr. (1851–1926), mayor of Green Bay, Wisconsin, son of Simon J. Murphy, Sr.
 Simon Murphy (hurler) (born 1949), Irish retired hurler